Justin Wayne Ledet (born September 28, 1988) is an American professional mixed martial artist and boxer who competes in the Light Heavyweight division. A professional since 2010, he has most notably competed for the Ultimate Fighting Championship.

Background
Born and raised in the Houston, Texas area, Ledet was a talented basketball player, competing as a small forward for NCAA Division II Texas A&M University-Kingsville. Upon quitting basketball, Ledet began training in mixed martial arts to stay in shape and was introduced to the sport through his cousin.

Mixed martial arts career

Early career
Before joining the UFC, Ledet amassed a record of 6-0-1 with all of his wins thus far coming by stoppages, fighting almost exclusively in his home state of Texas. He also held an amateur record of 3-0 before turning professional.

Ultimate Fighting Championship
Ledet made his promotional debut on August 6, 2016 at UFC Fight Night 92 against Chase Sherman. He won the fight via unanimous decision.

Ledet's next fight came on November 19, 2016 at UFC Fight Night 99 against Mark Godbeer. He won the fight via submission in the first round.

Ledet was expected to face promotional newcomer Dmitriy Sosnovskiy on February 4, 2017 at UFC Fight Night 104. However, Ledet pulled out of the fight on January 26 citing an undisclosed injury. In turn, promotional officials confirmed that Ledet was suspended for four months after testing positive for an anabolic agent in a contaminated supplement.

Ledet was expected to face Dmitriy Sosnovskiy on September 16, 2017 at UFC Fight Night 116. Subsequently, Sosnovskiy was removed from the card on September 10 and replaced by promotional newcomer Zu Anyanwu. He won the back-and-forth fight via split decision.

Ledet faced Aleksandar Rakić on July 22, 2018 at UFC Fight Night 134. He lost the fight via unanimous decision. 

Ledet faced Johnny Walker on February 2, 2019 at UFC Fight Night 144. He lost the fight via TKO in the first round.

Ledet was expected to face promotional newcomer Dalcha Lungiambula on June 29, 2019 at UFC on ESPN 3. However, on June 24, it was announced that Ledet was removed from the card for undisclosed reason. 

Ledet faced Aleksa Camur on January 18, 2020 at UFC 246. He lost the fight by unanimous decision.

Ledet faced Dustin Jacoby on October 31, 2020 at UFC Fight Night 181. He lost the fight via TKO in the first round.

On November 13, 2020, the UFC announced that they had released him.

Mixed martial arts record

|-
|Loss
|align=center|9–4 (1)
|Dustin Jacoby
|TKO (leg kicks and punches)
|UFC Fight Night: Hall vs. Silva
|
|align=center|1
|align=center|2:38
|Las Vegas, Nevada, United States
|
|-
|Loss
|align=center| 9–3 (1)
|Aleksa Camur
|Decision (unanimous)
|UFC 246 
|
|align=center|3
|align=center|5:00
|Las Vegas, Nevada, United States
|
|-
|Loss
|align=center| 9–2 (1)
|Johnny Walker
|TKO (spinning back fist and punches)
|UFC Fight Night: Assunção vs. Moraes 2
|
|align=center|1
|align=center|0:15
|Fortaleza, Brazil 
|
|-
|Loss
|align=center| 9–1 (1)
|Aleksandar Rakić
|Decision (unanimous)
|UFC Fight Night: Shogun vs. Smith 
|
|align=center|3
|align=center|5:00
|Hamburg, Germany
|
|-
|Win
|align=center| 9–0 (1)
|Zu Anyanwu
|Decision (split)
|UFC Fight Night: Rockhold vs. Branch 
|
|align=center|3
|align=center|5:00
|Pittsburgh, Pennsylvania, United States
|
|-
|Win
|align=center| 8–0 (1)
| Mark Godbeer
|Submission (rear-naked choke)
| UFC Fight Night: Mousasi vs. Hall 2
| 
|align=center|1
|align=center|2:16
| Belfast, Northern Ireland
|
|-
|Win
|align=center| 7–0 (1)
| Chase Sherman
|Decision (unanimous)
| UFC Fight Night: Rodríguez vs. Caceres
| 
|align=center|3
|align=center|5:00
| Salt Lake City, Utah, United States
|
|-
|NC
|align=center| 6–0 (1)
|Brice Ritani-Coe
|NC (accidental eye poke)
| Legacy FC 55
|
|align=center|1
|align=center|1:37
| Houston, Texas, United States
|
|-
|Win
|align=center|6–0
|Jon Hill
|Submission
|RITC 44
|
|align=center|1
|align=center|1:47
|Oklahoma City, Oklahoma, United States
|
|-
|Win
|align=center|5–0
|Jordan Clissold
|TKO (punches)
|IXFA 8
|
|align=center|1
|align=center|0:59
|Vinton, Louisiana, United States
|
|-
|Win
|align=center|4–0
|Ike Villanueva
|Submission (armbar)
|Immortal Kombat Fighting
|
|align=center|3
|align=center|0:40
|Spring, Texas, United States
|
|-
|Win
|align=center|3–0
|Alexander Pappas
|Submission 
|IXFA: Extreme Fighting
|
|align=center|1
|align=center|0:26
|Winnie, Texas, United States
|
|-
|Win
|align=center|2–0
|Jason Sullivan
|TKO (punches)
|IXFA
|
|align=center|1
|align=center|2:46
|Houston, Texas, United States
|
|-
|Win
|align=center|1–0
|Josh Foster
|Submission (leg triangle)
|IXFA
|
|align=center|3
|align=center|0:58
|Houston, Texas, United States
|

See also
 List of male mixed martial artists

References

External links
 
 

Living people
1988 births
People from Brazoria County, Texas
American male mixed martial artists
Heavyweight mixed martial artists
Mixed martial artists utilizing boxing
Mixed martial artists utilizing Brazilian jiu-jitsu
Mixed martial artists from Texas
Ultimate Fighting Championship male fighters
American practitioners of Brazilian jiu-jitsu